James Clarke (born 31 December 1984) is a British lightweight rower. He learned to row at St Paul's School, London and went on to row for Durham University, under the tutelage of Wade Hall-Craggs. Clarke was a member of St Cuthbert's Society and graduated in 2006. He won a gold medal at the 2007 World Rowing Championships in Munich with the lightweight men's four.
He competed at the Beijing Olympics in 2008, coming 5th. 
Following the 2008 season he changed weight categories, switching to compete in the open weight category. He gained selection for the GB men's heavyweight squad, competing in the men's eight in 2009, finishing 5th and then in 2010 winning a silver medal at the Karapiro World Championships in New Zealand.

See also 
 Richard Chamber
 Will Fletcher

References

1984 births
Living people
British male rowers
World Rowing Championships medalists for Great Britain
Olympic rowers of Great Britain
Rowers at the 2008 Summer Olympics
Alumni of St Cuthbert's Society, Durham
Durham University Boat Club rowers